Preston Corporal (born March 9, 1987) is a Liberian former footballer who played in the Liberian Premier League, Malaysian Super League, National Football League, National Premier League, and the Canadian Soccer League.

Playing career 
Corporal began his career in 2002 with Watanga FC of the Liberian Second Division League, and at the conclusion of the season he was named the Liberia Football Association Most Valuable Player. In 2005, he went overseas to sign with ATM FA of the Malaysia Super League. Where in his debut season he bagged a total of 36 goals in all competitions. The following season he was loaned to a four-month deal to Mohammedan S.C. of the National Football League, to help the club escape relegation. In 2009, he signed with Village United F.C. of the National Premier League. In 2010, Corporal signed with Hamilton Croatia of the Canadian Soccer League. He made his debut for the club on June 11, 2010 in a match against Brantford Galaxy. He helped Croatia finish third in the overall standings, and clinched a postseason berth.

In the playoffs Corporal contributed by scoring two goals in the quarterfinal series match against TFC Academy. He featured in the CSL Championship match against Brantford Galaxy, but Hamilton would lose the match to a score of 3-0. In 2012, former Hamilton Croatia head coach Ron Davidson recruited Corporal when he was appointed head coach for Brantford Galaxy. He made his debut for the club on May 6, 2012 in a match against York Region Shooters. In 2013, he signed with Niagara United, and his signing was announced on May 8, 2013.

International career 
Corporal made his debut for the Liberia national football team on October 11, 2008 in the 2010 FIFA World Cup qualification – CAF Second Round match against Algeria.

References 

1987 births
Living people
Liberian footballers
Liberia international footballers
ATM FA players
Mohammedan SC (Kolkata) players
Village United F.C. players
Hamilton Croatia players
Brantford Galaxy players
Malaysia Super League players
National Football League (India) players
Canadian Soccer League (1998–present) players
People from Buchanan, Liberia
Association football forwards
National Premier League players